The anterior nuclei of thalamus (or anterior nuclear group) are a collection of nuclei at the rostral end of the dorsal thalamus. They comprise the anteromedial, anterodorsal, and anteroventral nuclei.

Inputs and outputs
The anterior nuclei receive afferents from the mammillary bodies via the mammillothalamic tract and from the subiculum via the fornix. In turn, they project to the cingulate gyrus.

The anterior nuclei of the thalamus display functions pertaining to memory.  Persons displaying lesions in the anterior thalamus, preventing input from the pathway involving the hippocampus, mammillary bodies and the MTT, display forms of amnesia, supporting the anterior thalamus's involvement in episodic memory. However, although the hypothalamus projects to both the mammillary bodies and the anterior nuclei of the thalamus, the anterior nuclei receive input from hippocampal cells deep to the pyramidal cells projecting to the mammillary bodies.

These nuclei are considered to be association nuclei, one of the three broader subdivisions of thalamic nuclei.  These nuclei receive input from the cerebral cortex. The input received is integrated and re-directed back to the cortical areas of the cerebrum known as association areas.  The anterior nuclei regulates what input is redistributed to the cortex. The connections of the anterior nuclei are similar to that of the lateral dorsal (LD) nuclei.

Function
These nuclei are thought to play a role in the modulation of alertness and are involved in learning and episodic memory. They are considered to be part of the limbic system.

The anterior thalamic nuclei (ATN) are recently thought to be connected in pathways serving a spatial navigation role in reference to propagating head movements. The ATN displays bidirectional connections with the postsubiculum, a structure in humans involved in regulating signaling relative to the movement of the head in the horizontal plane. This structure contains "head direction cells" hypothesized to also be present in the ATN. These head direction cells fire in response to an animal pointing its head in a certain direction. Ultimately, the firing sequences of these cells encode information allowing an animal to perceive its direction in relation to its spatial environment.

Additional images

References

External links
 NIF Search - Anterior Nuclear Group via the Neuroscience Information Framework